Mohamed Aden Sheikh (c. 1936 – September 30, 2010) was a Somali medical doctor and politician who held posts as Minister of Health, Minister of Education, and Minister of Information.

Aden was the first Somali surgeon who received his medical training at the University of Rome and practiced at Mogadishu General Hospital. He enter politics in the 1970s and held various cabinet positions. Aden was also a central committee member of the only political party allowed in Somalia, the Somali Revolutionary Socialist Party. On June 9, 1982, he was one of seven parliamentarians arrested and accused of treason for having criticized the government of President Siad Barre. Aden was the president of the Somali National Academy of Sciences and Arts at the time of his arrest.

He was also the former Head of the Ideology Bureau SRRC and Somali Technological Development.

References

External links
November 1999, Interview - Society for International Development

1930s births
2010 deaths
Government ministers of Somalia